Trương, or Truong without diacritics, is a Vietnamese surname formerly written as  in the Han script. It is derived from the Chinese surname Zhang, one of the most common surnames in China and Taiwan. According to the 2010 United States Census, Trương is the 903rd most common surname in the United States, belonging to 38267 individuals. Trương is most common among Asian/Pacific Islander (96.87%) individuals.

Origin and history

The Vietnamese surname Trương derives from the Chinese surname Zhang, both written in the Han script as 張. Zhang is the third most common Chinese surname in China and fourth in Taiwan.

List of people with the given name and surname

 Paul Truong (born 1965), American chess player, trainer, and organizer
 Peter Truong, convicted child sexual abuser
 Trương Bửu Diệp (1897–1946), Vietnamese Catholic priest
 Trương Định (1820–64), Nguyễn Dynasty mandarin
 Trương Đình Dzu, lawyer and politician
 Trương Hòa Bình First Deputy Prime Minister of the Socialist Republic of Vietnam. 
 Truong Dinh Tuyen, Minister of Trade of Vietnam
 Trương Gia Bình, businessman
 Trương Tấn Sang, former State President of Vietnam
 Trương Mỹ Hoa, former Vice State President of Vietnam
 Truong Ngoc Anh, Vietnamese model and actress
 Trương Như Tảng, lawyer and politician
 Trương Tấn Bửu, general and official of the Nguyễn Dynasty
 Trương Văn Cam or Năm Cam, Vietnamese gangster
 Trương Vĩnh Ký (1837–1898), 19th century Vietnamese Catholic who served the French colonial regime
 Truong Vinh Trong, Deputy Prime Minister of Vietnam
 André Truong Trong Thi (1936–2005), Vietnamese-French engineer, called the "father of the personal computer"
 Andy Truong (born 1996), Australian fashion designer
 Doris Truong, president of the Asian American Journalists Association
 Monique Truong, Writer

Vietnamese-language surnames